Lampanyctus festivus is a species of lanternfish. It is found in the Atlantic, Indian, and Pacific Oceans. It is a mesopelagic fish that undertakes diel vertical migration. It grows to about  standard length. It is an important component in the diet of forkbeard Phycis phycis off the Azores.

References

Lampanyctus
Fish of the Atlantic Ocean
Fish of the Indian Ocean
Fish of the Pacific Ocean
Fish described in 1928
Taxa named by Åge Vedel Tåning